Abukari Dawuni (born 27 January 1977) is a Ghanaian politician who is a member of the National Democratic Congress. He is the member of parliament for the Wulensi Constituency in the Northern Region of Ghana

Early life and education 
Dawuni was born in Wulensi, He holds a BA in Admin (Management Technology)

References 

1977 births
Living people
Ghanaian Muslims
National Democratic Congress (Ghana) politicians
Ghanaian MPs 2021–2025